Road Thru the Heart is the fifth studio album by the Australian country music artist John Williamson. It was released in 1985 and was inspired by Williamson's travels around the evocative Australian outback.

At the Country Music Awards of Australia in July 1986, Williamson won his first Album of the Year award for Road Thru the Heart. He also won the Male Vocalist of the Year award for the single "You and My Guitar".

Track listing

Release history

References

1985 albums
Festival Records albums
John Williamson (singer) albums